Rustam Bhatti (born February 18, 1990 in Lahore, Punjab, Pakistan)  is a Canadian cricketer of Pakistani origin who represents the Canada national cricket team. He is a right hand batsman who has also captained the Canada U-19 cricket team.

Bhatti scored 175 runs during the U-19 World Cup Qualifiers, including one half-century, and has gained first-class cricket experience while playing for Canada in the ICC Intercontinental Cup.

References

External links
Rustam Bhatti at ESPNcricinfo

1990 births
Canadian cricketers
Canada One Day International cricketers
Canada Twenty20 International cricketers
Rustam
Rustam
Living people
Rustam
Rustam